Riblja Čorba 10 is a promo compilation album by Serbian and former Yugoslav rock band Riblja Čorba. Riblja Čorba 10 is the band's first official compilation album. It was released in 1987 in a limited number of 1,000 copies only, to mark Riblja Čorba's ten years of existence, and was given to the friends of the band and the media.

Track listing
"Lutka sa naslovne strane" - 3:07
"Ostani đubre do kraja" - 4:38
"Nazad u veliki prljavi grad" - 3:03
"Na zapadu ništa novo" - 3:05
"Dva dinara druže" - 4:02
"Dobro jutro" - 4:33
"Kad hodaš" - 4:05
"Pogledaj dom svoj, anđele" - 3:37
"Amsterdam" - 3:46
"Kada padne noć (Upomoć)" - 4:25

Credits
Bora Đorđević - vocals
Rajko Kojić - guitar
Momčilo Bajagić - guitar
Vidoja Božinović - guitar
Nikola Čuturilo - guitar
Miša Aleksić - bass guitar
Vicko Milatović - drums
Vladimir Golubović - drums

References
Riblja Čorba 10 at Discogs
 EX YU ROCK enciklopedija 1960-2006,  Janjatović Petar;

External links
Riblja Čorba 10 at Discogs

Riblja Čorba compilation albums
1988 compilation albums
PGP-RTB compilation albums